Papassara Techapaibul (born November 24, 1969) is Miss Thailand World 1988.

Currently, she works as a drama television actress and director.

References

1969 births
Living people
Papassara Techapaibun
Papassara Techapaibun
Miss Thailand World